Urshell James "Jesse" Whittenton (May 9, 1934 – May 21, 2012) was an American football player who played nine seasons in the NFL, mainly for the Green Bay Packers.

Whittenton also played golf on the Senior PGA Tour in the late 1980s. His best finish was T-21 at the 1989 Showdown Classic.

References

External links

1934 births
2012 deaths
People from Big Spring, Texas
Players of American football from Texas
American football cornerbacks
UTEP Miners football players
Green Bay Packers players
Los Angeles Rams players
Western Conference Pro Bowl players
PGA Tour Champions golfers
American male golfers